The Sierra Madre forest mouse (Apomys sierrae) is a forest mouse endemic to the Sierra Madre Range of eastern Luzon, Philippines.

References

Apomys
Rodents of the Philippines
Mammals described in 2011
Endemic fauna of the Philippines